Alturas Lake is a freshwater lake located on the northern slope of Bald Eagle Peak, in King County, Washington. Alturas Lake drains North towards Tonga Ridge and into the East Fork of the Foss River.

Access 
Access to Alturas Lake is through Necklace Valley Trail #1062 off Foss River Road (Forest Service Road #68), which exits US Highway 2 approximately at mile marker 50.5, just east of the Skykomish Ranger Station. The trail ends in Jade Lake further East from Alturas Lake. Self-issued Alpine Lake Wilderness permit required for transit within the Necklace Valley area.

See also 
 List of lakes of the Alpine Lakes Wilderness

References 

Lakes of King County, Washington
Lakes of the Alpine Lakes Wilderness
Okanogan National Forest